John Sousanis is publisher and co-founder of TheDetroiter.com.
John served as an entertainment writer, theater critic, and weekly columnist for the Oakland Press from 1996 through 2003. He is the co-author of  Constitutional Amendments: From Freedom of Speech to Flag Burning (UXL 2001), a three-volume history of the process and politics surrounding ratified and proposed amendments to the US Constitution. Born in Michigan, John is an alumnus of Harvard University. Sousanis has authored two plays that were produced by Planet Ant Theatre in Hamtramck, Michigan. As of 2005, he serves as president of the Board of Directors of Meadow Brook Theatre Ensemble, Michigan's largest professional theater.

References

External links
thedetroiter.com
review of Sousanis' play "Usher"
2nd review

Living people
Harvard University alumni
American dramatists and playwrights
Year of birth missing (living people)